Mongolia elects its head of state—the President of Mongolia—at the national level. The president is elected for a four-year term by the people, using the Two-round system. The State Great Khural (Ulsyn Ikh Khural, State Great Assembly) has 76 members, originally elected for a four-year term from single-seat constituencies. Due to the voting system, Mongolia experienced extreme shifts in the composition of the parliament after the 1996, 2000, and 2004 elections, so it has changed to a more proportional system in which some seats are filled on the basis of votes for local candidates, and some on the basis of nationwide party preference totals. Beginning in 2008, local candidates were elected from 26 electoral districts. Beginning with the 2012 elections, a parallel system was enacted, combining a district part and a nationwide proportional part. 48 seats are chosen at the local level in 26 districts with 1-3 seats using Plurality-at-large voting. 28 seats are chosen from nationwide closed party lists using the Largest remainder method. In the district seats, a candidate is required to get at least 28% of the vote cast in a district to be elected. If there are seats that are not filled due to this threshold, a runoff election is held in the respective district with twice the number of representatives as there are seats to be filled, between the top vote-getters of the first round.

Dominant parties are the Mongolian People's Party (MPP), the Democratic Party (DP or AH), the Mongolian People's Revolutionary Party (MPRP) and the Civil Will-Green Party (CWGP). In the 2012 legislative elections, the MPRP and Mongolian National Democratic Party ran together as the Justice Coalition, winning 11 seats.

Latest elections

2021 presidential election

2020 legislative election

See also
 Electoral calendar
 Electoral system
 Political parties in Mongolia
 2004 Mongolian legislative election
 2000 Mongolian legislative election
 1996 Mongolian legislative election
 1992 Mongolian legislative election

References

External links
Adam Carr's Election Archive